This is a list of notable alumni of the University of North Carolina at Chapel Hill.

Academia

University leaders

Professors

Arts and literature

Artists

Playwrights

Poets

Writers

Other

Business

Entertainment and broadcasting

Actors

Broadcasters

Musicians

Writers, producers, directors

Other

Journalism

Pulitzer Prize winners

Politics and public life

President of the United States

Vice President of the United States

Governors and Lieutenant  Governors

U.S. Senators

U.S. Representatives

U.S. cabinet members and other executive officers

Federal judges

Law

Religious leaders

Other

Sciences

Sports

Baseball

Basketball players

Basketball coaches

Football players

Football coaches

Golfers

Soccer

Sports administrators

Track and field

Other sports

Miscellaneous

References

External links
University of North Carolina at Chapel Hill

University of North Carolina at Chapel Hill alumni